Grant Robinson may refer to:

Grant Robinson (cricketer) (born 1979), New Zealand cricketer
Grant Robinson (soccer) (born 1998), American soccer player

See also
Grant Robertson (born 1971), New Zealand politician